Bogovinje (/bɒgɒviːnə/) is a village in the municipality of Bogovinje, North Macedonia. It is a seat of the Bogovinje municipality.

Sports
The village also has a stadium home to FK Drita called Stadion Bogovinje.

Demographics
As of the 2021 census, Bogovinje had 5,239 residents with the following ethnic composition:
Albanians 4,829
Persons for whom data are taken from administrative sources 405
Macedonians 1
Others 4

According to the 2002 census, the village had a total of 6328 inhabitants. Ethnic groups in the village include:

Albanians 6273
Macedonians 1
Romani 5
Others 49

References

External links

Villages in Bogovinje Municipality
Albanian communities in North Macedonia